Maja Vojnović  (born 26 January 1998) is a Slovenian handball player for Saint-Amand Handball and the Slovenian national team.

She was selected to represent Slovenia at the 2017 World Women's Handball Championship and at the 2022 European Women's Handball Championship.

References

External links

1998 births
Living people
Slovenian female handball players
Sportspeople from Novo Mesto